This is a list of Indian reservations and Pueblos in the U.S. state of New Mexico.

List of Reservations and Pueblos

See also
Puebloan peoples
Ancestral Puebloans
List of Ancestral Puebloan dwellings in New Mexico
List of federally recognized tribes in New Mexico
List of Indian reservations in the United States

References

−

Reservations
Native American-related lists